Siwi (also known as Siwan or Siwa Berber;) is the easternmost Berber language, spoken in the western Egyptian desert by an estimated 15,000 to 20,000 people in the oases of Siwa and Gara, near the Libyan border.

Siwi is the normal language of daily communication among the Egyptian Berbers of Siwa and Gara, but because it is not taught at local schools, used in the media nor recognised by the Egyptian government, its long-term survival may be threatened by contacts with outsiders and by the use of Egyptian Arabic in mixed marriages; nearly all Siwis today learn to speak Egyptian Arabic as a second language from an early age.

Siwi has been heavily influenced by Arabic, notably Egyptian and Bedouin, but also earlier stages of Arabic.

Siwi is the only Berber language indigenous to Egypt and is natively spoken further east than any other Berber variety of North Africa. Siwi also shows a typological feature that is strikingly rare, not only regionally but also worldwide: addressee agreement on demonstratives.

Classification
Siwi was traditionally associated with the Zenati subgroup of Berber, following the 15th century historian al-Maqrizi, and Destaing (1920/3) treated it as part of a "groupe du Nord" including Zenati, on the basis of similarities in the verbal system. Vycichl (2005) notes that it shares the feature of prefix vowel reduction with Zenati. Aikhenvald and Militarev (1984), followed by Ethnologue placed Siwi in an Eastern Berber group, along with Awjila and Sokna in eastern and central Libya. Kossmann (1999) links it with Sokna and the Nafusi dialect cluster of western Libya and Tunisia, but not with Awjila. Souag (2013) similarly argues, based on shared innovations, that Siwi emerged from a dialect continuum stretching between Nafusi and Sokna that excluded Awjila, and went on to have some influence on Awjila after this dialect continuum's breakup.

The "Endangered Languages Project" classifies the Siwa language as vulnerable to extinction, listing a 20% certainty based on compiled evidence.

Phonology
As analysed by Naumann (2012), Siwi has a total of 44 phonologically distinctive segments, 38 consonants and 6 vowels.

Consonants
The Siwa language contains 38 consonants, each of which can appear either short or long.

Notes

  are phonetically affricates, not stops.
  can appear as approximants.

The transcription of these consonants differs somewhat from source to source. However, the epiglottals are often instead transcribed as corresponding pharyngeals ħ, ʕ, avoiding the danger of mistaking <ɛ> for a vowel, while the voiced postalveolar affricate/fricative is often written as j or ž. All sources transcribe the glottal fricative as h.

Vowels
Siwi has six phonemic vowels: . The presence of mid vowels is unusual for a Berber language, and largely reflects Siwi-specific sound changes as well as borrowing from dialectal Arabic; before these changes, the proto-Berber distinction between *i and *e had been neutralized in every environment except before word-final .

Grammar
The basic word order of Siwi is subject-verb-object, as in:

Prepositions precede the noun phrase. Within the noun phrase, numerals (except, sometimes, 'one') precede the noun quantified, while other modifiers follow the head noun. Demonstratives always follow adjectives or possessive suffixes, and may even follow relative clauses, e.g.:

Nouns
Siwi nouns are specified for gender (masculine or feminine) and number (singular or plural; on the occasional occurrence of duals, see Numerical system below). Most nouns incorporate a fixed prefix, usually a- for masculine singular (e.g.,  'tooth'), i- for masculine plural (e.g.,  'teeth'), ta- for feminine singular (e.g.,  'intestine'), ti- for feminine plural (e.g.,  'intestines'). Arabic loans often start with invariant (ə)l-, usually assimilating to a following coronal, e.g.,  'pen',  'oil'. Pluralization is often also marked on the stem itself by internal changes, e.g.,  'jackal' vs.  'jackals',  'bird' vs.  'birds'.

In a noun either the last syllable or the second-to-last (penultimate) is stressed, depending on context. The factors determining stress in the noun remain a matter of debate. According to Souag (2013), stress depends essentially on definiteness: definite nouns receive penultimate stress, while indefinites are stressed on the last syllable. Schiattarella (2017) argues that the situation is somewhat more complicated: notably, locatives and right detached nouns receive accent on the last syllable, while left detached nouns are stressed on the penultimate.

Unlike most larger Berber languages, Siwi has no state distinction: a noun takes the same form whether used as subject or as object.

Adjectives
Siwi adjectives agree with their heads (or their referents) in gender and number, using a subset of the same affixes given above for nouns; for example:

However, agreement is not always complete. Feminine plural nouns often show masculine plural agreement.

Adjectives may be marked with a suffix -a, whose function, possibly aspectual, has not yet been conclusively established.

Gradable adjectives with no more than three root consonants form an invariant comparative based on the consonantal template (ə)CCəC, originally borrowed from Arabic: thus  'small' yields  'smaller',  'short' yields  'smaller',  'bitter' yields  'more bitter'. Adding a suffix  to this in turn yields the superlative.

Demonstratives
Demonstratives agree with their referent in number and, if singular, in gender; medial demonstratives also agree with the addressee, a typologically unusual type of allocutive agreement. The pronominal demonstratives are as follows:
 'this' (proximal): m. , f. , pl. 
 'this/that' (medial, speaking to a man): m. , f. , pl. 
 'this/that' (medial, speaking to a woman): m. , f. , pl. 
 'this/that' (medial, speaking to a group): m. , f. , pl. 
 'that' (distal): m. , f. , pl. 

When a demonstrative modifies a noun phrase, it takes a prefix da- (ta- for feminine singular). To form a presentative ('here is...'), it instead takes a prefix ɣ-. Placeholders ('whatsit', 'whatchamacallit') use the singular distal forms plus -in.

Demonstrative adverbials are based on the same series minus referent agreement markers: proximal -a / -aya, medial -ok / -om / -erwən, distal -ih. Locative adverbs ('here', 'there') prefix to these gd- (or approximate locative ss-), while adverbs of manner ('like this', 'like that') prefix ams-.

Personal pronouns
Siwi personal pronouns distinguish number and (in the singular only) gender. 
Siwi is a pro-drop language, so the use of independent forms is relatively limited; instead, agreement markers or referential suffixes usually suffice to make pronominal reference unambiguous. The following table gives the system:

Some subject agreement markers take different forms before indirect object agreement markers, indicated above with dashes on both sides (e.g., -m-). 3rd person direct object suffixes take different forms depending on whether they follow another affix or directly follow the stem. After 1Sg subject agreement, second person direct objects are expressed with the corresponding independent pronouns. The special series for 'because of' (/) is borrowed from Arabic.

Verbs
Siwi verbs agree in person, number, and (when singular) gender with their subjects and their indirect objects, and take suffixes marking pronominal objects. The verb 'open', for example, is conjugated in the perfective as follows:

In some cases, plural nouns trigger feminine singular agreement.

The order of pronominal affixes on the verb is as follows: (subject)-stem-(subject)-(indirect object)-(direct object), e.g.,  'he gave it (m.) to the woman'.

Siwi verbs are also marked for aspect and mood. The perfective form is identical to the stem for most verbs, but in a few is marked by a variable suffixed vowel. The imperfective is formed from the stem by a variety of morphological strategies, including gemination of the second consonant, t prefixation, and insertion of an a. A special perfect/resultative (unusual within Berber) is formed from the perfective by suffixing -a to a fully conjugated perfective verb including any suffixes, changing ə in the last syllable to i; the same procedure, applied to an imperfective verb, yields the meaning 'while'. Thus, for example, from the verb  'walk' Siwi derives:

 perfective  'he walked'
 resultative  'he has walked'
 imperfective  'he walks, he is walking, he was walking'
 imperfective+a  'while he is/was walking'
 ga+aorist  'he will walk, he would walk'
 ədda+aorist  'let him walk!'

Unlike many Berber languages, Siwi has no special verbal morphology for negation; in all aspects and moods, verbs are simply negated with the preverbal particle . The prohibitive ('do not'), however, uses the imperfective form of the verb, unlike the imperative which uses the basic stem.

Numerical system
The Siwi numerical system is almost entirely borrowed from Arabic; speakers have only retained two traditional Berber numerals, one and two, which are used rather consistently for qualifying nouns but compete with Arabic equivalents for the purpose of counting. The numerals 3-10 have the same form whether used for counting or for qualifying nouns. Numbers 11-19 are described by Naumann (2009) as having two separate forms for counting and qualifying nouns. The table that follows is from Naumann (2009), and (following the source) uses IPA rather than practical transcription.

Some speakers preserve a feminine form for inherited 'two', .

Literature
Siwi is not a written language, in the sense that Siwi people normally write in Standard Arabic. It is, however, the vehicle of a little-documented oral literature. Among the relatively few materials published, four genres are conspicuous: song lyrics or poems, fairy tales, riddles, and proverbs.

Verse
Siwi verse is written in rhyme, and is usually associated with song. Malim (2001:90-92, 96) distinguishes songs, led by one man, from poems, shorter verse works recited antiphonally by groups at weddings; both are accompanied by the music of drums and horns. In previous centuries these songs appear to have been of great symbolic importance to Siwi young men: a civil war in the oasis in 1712 was apparently terminated by a treaty including the stipulation that:

The earliest Siwi lyrics to be published are those gathered by Bricchetti-Robetti (1889); others have been published in Jawharī (1949) and Souag (2013), while Abd Allah (1917:26-27) and Malim (2001:92-97) provide several songs and poems in translation.  The songs were also studied from a musicological perspective by Schiffer (1936).  The following extract from a love song may give an idea of the genre:

Tales
A Siwi tale uses a specific opening formula:

 
  'at the door of our courtyard'

and closes with the formula:

 
 'Tale, tale, it has shortened its span.  A bundle of goodness to us, a bundle of badness to them.'

They were typically told by old women to children on evenings to entertain and perhaps to educate them.  Since the arrival of television in the oasis, this practice has largely disappeared.  Apart from humans and (talking) animals, a common character in such tales is the ogre or ogress.  The first Siwi tales to appear in print were four short fables gathered from men ("The Jackal and the Ewe", "The Jackal and the Hyena", "The Hare, the Jackal, the Hyena, and the Lion", and "The Magic Ring") in Laoust (1932:146-150).  Malim (2001) gives two Siwi folk tales ("The Green Cow" and "The King's Daughter and the Three Beautiful Girls") in English translation.  Schiattarella (2016) transcribes and translates fourteen tales, gathered from women.

Riddles
Malim (2001:85) describes riddles as "once the preferred pastime of Siwi women", who would meet at night to exchange them, but notes that they have largely been superseded by watching television.  Few Siwi riddles have been published; Malim (2001:85-87) gives some twenty, while Schiattarella (2016:117) records four, including:

Proverbs
Among existing publications on Siwi, only Malim (2001:95-85, 87-90) discusses proverbs in any detail, drawing a distinction between "morals", timeworn advice in proverbial form, and proverbs proper.  Examples of the former include "Wear clothes that others prefer, but eat and drink what you prefer"; of the latter, "A man who sells a cow, and asks for more money for the insect on it" (in his transcription), mocking excessive concern about small sums.

Writing samples
The thumbnail picture at the following link contains a list of pronouns and typical greetings first written in Siwi, then with the English pronunciation and translation, and ending with a description of the word in Arabic.

References

External links

 Pangloss archive of Siwi recordings with transcriptions and translations
 ELAR archive of Siwi narrative and conversation recordings
 World Atlas of Language Structures entry
Siwa Did you know Siwi is vulnerable? at the Endangered Languages Project
A young boy speaking Siwi Endangered Languages Project - Siwi - Boy speaking
Ongoing research on Siwi:
 Christfried Naumann
 Lameen Souag
 Valentina Schiattarella
 Valentina Serreli

Berber languages
Berbers in Egypt
Languages of Egypt
Endangered languages of Africa
Subject–verb–object languages